Maher Ameur (born 7 February 1987) is a retired Tunisian football forward.

References

1987 births
Living people
Tunisian footballers
Club Africain players
JS Kairouan players
ES Zarzis players
Grombalia Sports players
CS Hammam-Lif players
ES Métlaoui players
Association football forwards
Tunisian Ligue Professionnelle 1 players